Daxin is a town under the administration of Xinshao County, Hunan, China. , it has five residential communities and 17 villages under its administration:
Daxin Community
Litan Community
Dadong Community
Cixi Community
Longkouxi Community
Changfu Village
Longding Village
Dengdong Village
Tangxi Village
Xianan Village
Shentang Village
Sanmentan Village
Molin Village
Shangnanfu Village
Sanhe Village
Shuangxi Village
Shuanglong Village
Yangtang Village
Huaxin Village
Tongguding Village
Hexie Village
Yanzhuxin Village

References 

Towns of Hunan
Xinshao County